The transmission tower Wendelstein is a 55-metre-high transmission tower for FM and TV on the 1838-metre-high Wendelstein Mountain in Southern Bavaria. It was built in 1954 and has no facilities for visitors. The Transmission Tower Wendelstein is in spite of its small height a very important FM and TV facility because it can supply by its location on the Wendelstein Mountain large parts of Southern Bavaria with FM- and TV-programmes.

See also
List of towers

External links
 
 http://www.skyscraperpage.com/cities/?buildingID=54480

Radio masts and towers in Germany
1954 establishments in West Germany
Towers completed in 1954
Buildings and structures in Miesbach (district)